Barracão is a municipality in the state of Paraná in the Southern Region of Brazil. Barracão is part of a triple border with the state of Santa Catarina and the country of Argentina, with the border running through the middle of the municipality's urban center.

See also
List of municipalities in Paraná

References

Municipalities in Paraná